The Camels is a 1988 Italian comedy film written and directed by Giuseppe Bertolucci.

Plot 
Ferruccio Ferri is a young passionate about camels from Carpi who manages to win for four weeks in a row in a quiz program of a local television. The manager Camillo tries to capture the ephemeral popularity of Ferruccio and arranges for him and Miriam, a wacky and off-key singer, a tour along an improbable journey by camel across the entire Po Valley.

Cast 

 Paolo Rossi as Ferruccio Ferri
 Diego Abatantuono as  Camillo
 Giulia Boschi as  Anna Moretti 
 Sabina Guzzanti as  Miriam
 Ennio Fantastichini as  Pino
 Laura Betti as  Anna's mother
 Giancarlo Sbragia as   Anna's father
 Claudio Bisio as  Service-station attendant

References

External links

Italian comedy films
1988 comedy films
1988 films
Films directed by Giuseppe Bertolucci
Films with screenplays by Vincenzo Cerami
Films scored by Nicola Piovani
1980s Italian-language films

Colorado Films films
1980s Italian films